Arlene Leanore Golonka (January 23, 1936 – May 31, 2021) was an American actress. She is perhaps best known for playing Millie Hutchins on the television comedy The Andy Griffith Show and Millie Swanson on Mayberry R.F.D., and often portrayed bubbly, eccentric blondes in supporting character roles on stage, film, and television.

Early years
Golonka was born in Chicago on January 23, 1936, of Polish descent, the daughter of Elinor (Wroblewski) and Frank Golonka. She worked as a waitress.

Career

Golonka began performing in her early teenage years as part of a summer-stock theater company, and she gained additional experience with the Goodman Theatre in Chicago.

A life member of The Actors Studio, she appeared in her first major production, The Night Circus, with Ben Gazzara, at the Shubert Theater in New Haven, Connecticut on November 17, 1958. After a week-long trial run, the play moved to Broadway on December 2, 1958, but closed after only seven performances.

Despite that setback, she continued working in other plays such as Take Me Along with Jackie Gleason, Walter Pidgeon and Robert Morse (448 performances from late 1959 to late 1960), Neil Simon's first Broadway play, Come Blow Your Horn, which ran 677 performances from February 1961 until October 1962, and One Flew Over the Cuckoo's Nest, starring Kirk Douglas, from November 1963 until January 1964. Golonka appeared in two other Broadway plays from 1965-66, and took supporting roles in films produced in the New York City area.

"...Golonka was appearing on television on Naked City, Car 54, Where Are You? and The Doctors ...She moved to Los Angeles and worked on shows like Get Smart, Barnaby Jones, The Flying Nun, That Girl, Maude, Alice, The Rockford Files, One Day at a Time, Taxi, Murder, She Wrote and The King of Queens."

Golonka also recorded for a  comedy album, You Don't Have to Be Jewish, in 1965.

In 1967, Golonka moved to Los Angeles to try her hand at television. She made numerous TV appearances on such series as Car 54, Where Are You?, Get Smart, Barnaby Jones (in the episode titled “Bond of Fear”, 04/15/1975); The Flying Nun, I Spy, That Girl, The Mary Tyler Moore Show, M*A*S*H, All in the Family, Cannon, Maude, The Andy Griffith Show, Mayberry R.F.D., Alice, The Rockford Files, The Streets of San Francisco, One Day at a Time, The San Pedro Beach Bums, Taxi, Murder, She Wrote, The King of Queens, Valerie, Sunset Beat, and Matlock, among others.

In 1992, Golonka appeared as Sally Nash in the 13th episode "Fool for Love" in season 5 of the television series In the Heat of the Night with Carroll O'Connor. In this episode she played the other woman to a philandering Dr. Vance Talbot (played by actor Robert Ginty) who tries to frame her for the murder of his wife before murdering Nash as well. Golonka was a regular on the animated cartoon Speed Buggy, providing the voice of "Debbie", and had a recurring role on the short-lived TV series Joe & Valerie. She performed voices in other animated series including The New Yogi Bear Show, Capitol Critters, Yogi's Treasure Hunt, and The New Scooby-Doo Movies.

Golonka had supporting roles in some 30 films, including Harvey Middleman, Fireman (1965), Penelope (1966), The Busy Body (1967), Welcome to Hard Times (1967), Hang 'Em High (1968), The Elevator (1974), Airport '77 (1977), The In-Laws (1979), Love At First Bite (1980), The Last Married Couple in America (1980),  My Tutor (1983), The End of Innocence (1990), and A Family Affair (2001).

Personal life 
Golonka's NYC roommate was Valerie Harper.

Golonka was married and divorced three times. Her first husband was Christopher Michael Haenel. In 1962, she married jazz pianist and composer Mike Longo, and they divorced in 1967. She wed actor Larry Delaney, who appeared with her in one episode of Mayberry R.F.D., in 1969, and they divorced in 1977.

Later years and death
After moving to Los Angeles in 1967, Golonka resided in West Hollywood, California, until her death due to complications from Alzheimer's disease on May 31, 2021, at age 85.

Golonka read for Jewish Theatre.

Filmography

1963: Car 54, Where Are You?  as Laverne Montaine
1963: Love with the Proper Stranger as Marge (uncredited)
1964: Diary of a Bachelor as Lois
1965: Harvey Middleman, Fireman as Harriet
1966: Penelope as Honeysuckle Rose
1967: The Busy Body as Bobbi Brody
1967: Welcome to Hard Times as Mae
1968: Hang 'Em High as Jennifer
1968–1971: Mayberry R.F.D. as Millie Hutchins-Swanson
1971: The Mary Tyler Moore Show as Betty Bowerchuck
1972: M*A*S*H as Lieutenant Edwina “Eddie” Ferguson
1973: Speed Buggy as Debbie (voice)
1973: Sing a Song of Murder  Barnaby Jones as Sue Paige
1974: The Elevator (TV Movie) as Wendy Thompson
1975: Maude as Maybelle season 4 episode 10 
1975: The Secret Night Caller as Charlotte
1977: Airport '77 as Mrs. Jane Stern
1977: Alice as Shirley Bartlett
1979: The In-Laws as Jean Ricardo
1979:  Love Boat as Suzy Butterfield, Season 3, Episode 3
1980: The Last Married Couple in America as Sally Cooper
1981: Longshot as Evelyn Gripp
1981: Separate Ways as Annie Donahue
1982:  Love Boat as Doris Weldon season 5 episode 14
1983: Benson as Betty Braxton season 5, episode11
1983: My Tutor as Mrs. Chrystal
1983: Gimme a Break as Maxine
1986: Fox trap as Emily
1986: Detective School Dropouts (uncredited)
1987: "Hogan Family" as Darlene season 2 episode 22
1987: Survival Game as Barbara Hawkins
1989: Dr. Alien as Mom
1989: Trained to Kill as Martha Cooper
1990: The Gumshoe Kid as Gracie Sherman
1990: The End of Innocence as Claire
1990: Murder, She Wrote as Gloria Winslow
1991: Matlock as Jackie Flemming - Season 5 Episode 22
1993: Amore! as Acting Coach
1995: Cops n Roberts
1997: Leather Jacket Love Story as Mom
2001: A Family Affair as Leah Rosen

References

External links
 
 
 
 
 

1936 births
2021 deaths
Actresses from Chicago
American film actresses
American stage actresses
American television actresses
American voice actresses
20th-century American actresses
21st-century American actresses
American people of Polish descent